David Michael Culver,  (December 5, 1924 – February 6, 2017) was a Canadian businessman and former Chairman and CEO of Alcan Aluminum Limited, from 1979 to 1989.

Early life
Born in Winnipeg, Manitoba, Culver attended Selwyn House School, and Trinity College School. He received a Bachelor of Science from McGill University in 1947, an MBA from Harvard University, and a Certificate from the Centre d'Études Industrielles in Geneva.

He was a first cousin once removed of Conrad Black; his father’s sister was the maternal grandmother of Black.

Career
Culver began working at Alcan in 1949, eventually rising to CEO in 1979. From 1986 to 1989 he was Chairman of the Canadian Council of Chief Executives.

In 1989, he became a founding partner of CAI Private Equity, a firm specializing in leveraged buyouts, restructurings, acquisitions, and recapitalizations. He was a co-founder and Canadian Chairman for 11 years of the Canada-Japan Business Committee. He was the chairman of iLiv Technologies Inc. (iLiv.com). He was a member of the Augusta National Golf Club.

Culver was the author, with Alan Freeman, of "Expect Miracles: Recollections of a Lucky Life" (McGIll-Queen's University Press 2014).

In 1983 he was made an Officer of the Order of Canada and was promoted to Companion in 1988. In 1990 he was made an Officer of the National Order of Quebec. He also joined the Order of the Sacred Treasure, Grand Cordon, of Japan. Additionally, in 1990 he was awarded Concordia University's John Molson School of Business Award of Distinction.

Death
Culver died on February 6, 2017, aged 92.

References

 
 

1924 births
2017 deaths
Businesspeople from Winnipeg
Canadian chief executives
Canadian investors
Companions of the Order of Canada
Harvard Business School alumni
Officers of the National Order of Quebec
Private equity and venture capital investors
Black family (Canada)